is a former Japanese football player.

Club statistics

References

External links

1986 births
Living people
Association football people from Kyoto Prefecture
Japanese footballers
J1 League players
J2 League players
Japan Football League players
MIO Biwako Shiga players
Vissel Kobe players
FC Machida Zelvia players
Association football forwards